Donald Ray Woods (born February 17, 1951) is a former National Football League American football running back who played with the San Diego Chargers and San Francisco 49ers from 1974–1980.

College career
Woods attended New Mexico Highlands University for college before transferring to the University of New Mexico his senior year when New Mexico Highlands dropped their football program. He was a mobile quarterback for the Lobos, leading the team with both 869 yards on 52 of 124 passes, and 971 yards on 220 rushes for 11 touchdowns, and winning the team's MVP award. In a game against rival New Mexico St., he rushed for 188 yards, at the time the fourth most in school history, for which he won the UPI Back of the Week award on Sept. 15, 1973. He also both rushed and passed for 100+ yards in the same game twice, against Utah (100 and 134) and Colorado St. (148 and 128).

Professional career
Woods was selected in the 6th Round of the 1974 NFL Draft by the Green Bay Packers. Green Bay released Woods at the end of training camp and he was subsequently picked up by the Chargers early in the 1974 season. He was used almost exclusively as a running back, despite playing quarterback in college (albeit one who ran almost twice as often as passed). The move proved very fruitful for San Diego, as Woods, despite not suiting up until the 3rd week of the season, went on to set a then-NFL-rookie-rushing-record of 1,162 yards in only 12 games, including a then-rookie-record seven 100-yard rushing performances (weeks 3,4,5,7,10,12, and 14). Woods was selected the 1974 NFL Rookie of the Year. His seven rushing touchdowns and 96.8 rushing yards per game remain Chargers franchise rookie records, and his 1,162 rushing and 1,511 yards from scrimmage are second only to the numbers LaDainian Tomlinson put up in 2001.

A knee injury slowed Woods down during the 1975 campaign and while having several solid years with the Chargers, was never able to recapture the electricity of his rookie campaign. Woods was eventually phased out of the Chargers offense and traded to San Francisco during the 1980 season, finishing out his career that season with the 49ers. Woods finished his career with 3,087 career rushing yards and scored a total of 21 touchdowns.  As of November 2021, Woods remains number 8 on the all-time Chargers rushing list.

NFL Career Statistics

References

1951 births
Living people
Sportspeople from Denton, Texas
American football running backs
New Mexico Highlands Cowboys football players
New Mexico Lobos football players
San Diego Chargers players
San Francisco 49ers players
National Football League Offensive Rookie of the Year Award winners